Mark Andrew Eaton (born May 6, 1977) is an American former professional ice hockey defenseman who played 13 seasons in the National Hockey League (NHL) for the Philadelphia Flyers, Nashville Predators, Pittsburgh Penguins, and New York Islanders. He is the only NHL player to ever come from Delaware. He attended John Dickinson High School in the Wilmington suburbs but played his youth hockey across the state line in Pennsylvania. He is currently the director of player development for the Chicago Blackhawks.

Playing career

Eaton started his post-secondary competition with the Waterloo Black Hawks of the United States Hockey League (USHL).  He was named second team all-USHL, was the league's third-leading scoring defenseman and was honored with the Curt Hammer Award as the USHL's most gentlemanly player. Eaton then moved on to the University of Notre Dame of the Central Collegiate Hockey Association (CCHA). In his only season at UND, Eaton was named the CCHA Rookie of the Year after scoring 12 goals with 17 assists for 29 points.

On August 4, 1998, Eaton signed a contract with the  Philadelphia Flyers as an undrafted free agent. He made his NHL debut on October 2, 1999, against the Ottawa Senators, becoming the first player from the greater Delaware Valley region to play for the Flyers. Eaton scored his first NHL goal, which was the game-winning goal, on April 8, 2000, against Rob Tallas of the Boston Bruins. He played his first NHL playoff game on April 13 against the Buffalo Sabres.

Eaton was traded from the Flyers to the Nashville Predators on September 29, 2000, for a third round pick. While playing for the Predators in 2003–04, he set the franchise record for plus/minus at +16. He scored a career-high three assists in a 5–3 loss to the Colorado Avalanche on October 25, 2003. On March 3, 2006, Eaton was placed on injured reserve by the Predators with a strained knee injury.

The Pittsburgh Penguins signed Eaton on July 3, 2006, as a free agent. He saw limited time in his first two seasons, suffering with injuries, playing only 71 games between in 2006–07 and 2007–08.

He won the Stanley Cup with the Pittsburgh Penguins in 2009, scoring 4 goals in the playoffs. On March 30, 2009, Eaton was named a nominee for the Bill Masterton Trophy.

He signed with the New York Islanders as a free agent to a two-year contract on July 2, 2010.

On January 22, 2013, the Wilkes-Barre/Scranton Penguins of the AHL announced Eaton had signed with the team on a Professional Try Out. He was released in February, and started skating with his former NHL team, the Pittsburgh Penguins. On February 25, the Penguins signed Eaton to a 1-year deal worth $725,000.

International play
Eaton played for the United States at the 2001 Men's World Ice Hockey Championships and recorded one goal (the game-winner vs. Finland) and one assist in nine games. He also played for the United States at the 2002 World Championships in Sweden and registered three assists in a 5–2 win vs. Italy.

Career statistics

Regular season and playoffs

International

Awards and honors

 Second Team USHL All-Star in 1997
 Only the second University of Notre Dame player to be named CCHA Rookie of the Year (as selected by the conference's coaches) in 1997–98
 Won the Barry Ashbee Award in 1998–99 which is given to the Philadelphia Phantoms' top defenseman
 The first ice hockey player to be named Delaware's athlete of the year by the Delaware Sportswriters and Broadcasters Association on January 27, 2000
 Named the IHL Defenseman of the Week for the week of December 18–24, 2000
 Stanley Cup championship in 2009 (Pittsburgh)

References

External links

 

1977 births
American men's ice hockey defensemen
Chicago Blackhawks coaches
Grand Rapids Griffins players
Ice hockey people from Delaware
Living people
Milwaukee Admirals players
Milwaukee Admirals (IHL) players
Nashville Predators players
New York Islanders players
Notre Dame Fighting Irish men's ice hockey players
Philadelphia Flyers players
Philadelphia Phantoms players
Pittsburgh Penguins players
Sportspeople from Wilmington, Delaware
Stanley Cup champions
Undrafted National Hockey League players
Waterloo Black Hawks players
Wilkes-Barre/Scranton Penguins players